Cape Wiman is a low, rocky cape marking the north extremity of Seymour Island, James Ross Island group. Probably first seen by Sir James Ross in January 1843, but the cape was not adequately surveyed until 1902-03 when the Swedish expedition under Nordenskjold wintered in the area. Named by United Kingdom Antarctic Place-Names Committee (UK-APC) after C. Wiman, who worked on the Seymour Island fossils collected by the Swedish expedition.

See also
Bertodano Bay

Headlands of the James Ross Island group